Gautam Kaul is a John C. and Sally S. Morley Professor of Finance in the Ross School of Business, University of Michigan.

Kaul's research focuses on the behavior of stock and bond prices including asset pricing models, market microstructure and the time-series behavior of stock prices. He uses computer-intensive methodologies to gauge the effectiveness of trading strategies commonly proposed on Wall Street and in academic literature.

Kaul has published widely in top finance journals and was awarded the Senior Faculty Research Award in 2003 for sustained, exceptional, and continuing contributions to scholarly research in the field of business, and noteworthy contributions to building and maintaining a strong research environment at RSB.

Kaul is also involved in University of Michigan Social Venture Fund helping new innovative businesses create a greater social impact.

Selected publications
Value versus Glamour
Good Capital
Predictable Components in Stock Returns
Acumen: Valuing Social Venture
Oil and the Stock Markets
Information, Trading and Volatility
Asymmetric Predictability of Conditional Variances

References 

Gautam Kaul, LinkedIn profile page
Gautam Kaul, Selected publications

External links 
Official Faculty page at University of Michigan

Living people
Ross School of Business faculty
University of Chicago alumni
Delhi University alumni
1954 births